Qinarjeh (also Romanized as Qīnarjeh and Qeynarjeh) is a village in Ahmadabad Rural District, Takht-e Soleyman District, Takab County, West Azerbaijan Province, Iran. At the 2006 census, its population was 907, in 201 families.

References 

Populated places in Takab County